Lonchiphora is a genus of glass sponge in the family Farreidae.

References

Hexactinellida
Hexactinellida genera